Mike McLeod is a Canadian film and television actor, best known for his performance as The Priest in the television series Forgive Me.

Originally from London, Ontario, he is the son of lawyer and University of Western Ontario law professor James McLeod and Ontario Superior Court justice Margaret McSorley. McLeod moved to Halifax, Nova Scotia in 2003 to attend Dalhousie University. His play Good For Nothings was staged in 2013.

He received a Canadian Screen Award nomination for Best Actor in a Drama Series at the 3rd Canadian Screen Awards in 2015 for his work on Forgive Me. From 2015 through 2017, he won a record-breaking three back to back ACTRA Awards for Best Lead Actor for his role as The Priest in Forgive Me.

He has also had supporting roles in the television series Sex & Violence, Haven, The Flash, The Man in the High Castle, the web series Moderation Town and Forgive Me Web Confessions and the short film Argus.

References

External links

Living people
21st-century Canadian male actors
Canadian male film actors
Canadian male stage actors
Canadian male television actors
Male actors from Halifax, Nova Scotia
Male actors from London, Ontario
Dalhousie University alumni
Canadian male web series actors
21st-century Canadian dramatists and playwrights
Canadian male dramatists and playwrights
1985 births
21st-century Canadian male writers